Lower Cowley is a rural locality in the Cassowary Coast Region, Queensland, Australia.

Geography 
Liverpool Creek flows through Lower Cowley and enters the Coral Sea at Cowley Beach. The land is flat and low-lying and is used to grow crops, predominantly sugarcane. There is a cane tramway through the locality to transport the harvested sugarcane to the local sugar mills.

History 
The locality takes its name from Cowley Beach, which in turn is named after horticulturalist Ebenezer Cowley, who was the overseer at Kamerunga State Nursery.

References 

Cassowary Coast Region
Localities in Queensland